Earl St. John (14 June 1892 – 26 February 1968) was an American film producer in overall charge of production for The Rank Organisation at Pinewood Studios from 1950 to 1964, and was credited as executive producer on 131 films. He was known as the "Earl of Pinewood". John Davis of Rank called him "the greatest showman that The Rank Organisation has ever had, and probably the greatest showman to have lived in this country. "

Early life
St. John was born in Baton Rouge, Louisiana. His father wanted him to become a soldier but he ran away from a military academy aged 17 and began his career as a page boy for Sarah Bernhardt's company.

St. John's uncle worked in the film business and he worked for him when he was 21. He worked as a poster boy then took two religious films around the US and Mexico. He worked during the Mexican Civil War and met Pancho Villa. He fell out with his uncle and joined the Mutual Film Company.

Move to England
St. John served in France with the Texas division during World War I. He demobilised in Liverpool, England, and elected to stay on in the country.

St. John ran a small picture theatre in Manchester and became successful. In 1924, he joined Paramount Theatres Limited, building up its circuit and opening the Plaza and Carlton cinemas. In 1930, they took over the Astoria Cinemas and St. John was responsible for them as well.

Paramount was bought out by Odeon in 1938 and St. John joined The Rank Organisation. In 1939 he became personal assistant to John Davis.

Rank Organisation
In 1946 St. John was appointed chief production adviser for the Rank Organisation.

Two Cities
In May 1947 he was appointed joint managing director of Two Cities Films along with Josef Somlo. Their films included Hamlet, Fame is the Spur, Uncle Silas, The October Man, Vice Versa, The Mark of Cain and One Night with You.

Head of Rank

Early films
In 1948 he was appointed Executive Producer at the studios by Rank's Managing Director John Davis with a brief to rein in financial losses. "Some producers objected because he was a showman," said one producer of this time.

Early films made under St. John at Rank included the musical Trottie True (1949) with Jean Kent, and the fantasy The Rocking Horse Winner (1949) with John Mills. The Woman in Question (1950) was a thriller with Kent and Dirk Bogarde, and Highly Dangerous (1950) was an unsuccessful attempt to restore Margaret Lockwood to her mid 1940s popularity.

Under his austere and autocratic control, location filming was cut back, and budgets slashed. The Reluctant Widow (1950) starred Kent and Guy Rolfe; Rolfe was in Prelude to Fame (1950). More successful than these were a war movie, They Were Not Divided (1950) and the drama The Browning Version (1951). The latter was based on a play by Terence Rattigan and St. John would go on to green-light a number of films based on plays. "I started out as manager of a small out-of-town cinema, and I viewed films from the out-of-London angle," he explained in 1951. "This experience made me realise that the ordinary people in the remotest places in the country were entitled to see the works of the best modern British playwrights." The film was directed by Anthony Asquith, and St. John promptly agreed to finance another play adaptation from that director, The Importance of Being Earnest (1952), which was popular. St. John would also finance a version of Romeo and Juliet (1954) shot in Italy.

Also popular was Encore (1951) based on the stories of W. Somerset Maugham, Venetian Bird (1952), a thriller from the director-producer team of Ralph Thomas and Betty E. Box who would become crucial to Rank, and The Card (1952) with Alec Guinness.

Less popular were dramas like It Started in Paradise (1952), Personal Affair (1953) and The Final Test (1953).

Colonial and war movies
St. John decided to finance an action drama set during the Malayan Emergency, The Planter's Wife (1952), directed by Ken Annakin and starring Jack Hawkins and Anthony Steel. In an attempt to appeal to American audiences, St. John arranged for Claudette Colbert to co-star. The movie was not successful in the US but was a big hit in Britain, and led to St. John making several movies with imperial settings.

These included Malta Story (1952), a hugely popular World War Two story with Guinness, Hawkins and Steel; The Seekers (1954), an adventure tale set in New Zealand with Hawkins and Glynis Johns; Above Us the Waves (1955), a war film with Mills and John Gregson; Simba (1955), set in the Mau Mau Uprising; and The Black Tent (1956) set in Africa, all three with Donald Sinden.

Thrillers
St. John green-lit a number of thrillers at Rank including Hunted (1952) with Dirk Bogarde, The Long Memory (1953) with John Mills, The Net (1953), Desperate Moment (1953) with Bogarde,  Turn the Key Softly (1953), The Kidnappers (1953) and Forbidden Cargo (1954), Passage Home (1955), Lost (1956), and House of Secrets (1956),

Dramas tended to be less popular such as The Young Lovers (1954), The Woman for Joe (1955), Jacqueline (1956).

Comedies
In the early 1950s St. John moved Rank more into the comedy area with films such as Made in Heaven (1952), Penny Princess (1953) with Bogarde, Always a Bride (1953), and A Day to Remember (1953). He was a big believer in making films in colour to compete with television. He also imported many actors from Europe to appear in Rank films.

St. John spotted Norman Wisdom on television in a Christmas Party special, signed him to a seven year contract and put him in his own vehicle, Trouble in Store (1953). This was a huge success at the British box office. It led to a series of popular Wisdom movies such as Man of the Moment (1955) and One Good Turn (1955).

He had a huge success with Genevieve, directed by Henry Cornelius, and starring John Gregson, Dinah Sheridan, Kenneth More and Kay Kendall. However his most profitable comedies were the "Doctor" series from Thomas and Box, starring Dirk Bogarde, starting with Doctor in the House (1954). This led to several sequels including Doctor at Sea (1955),

St. John had less success with musicals such as As Long as They're Happy (1955). Later comedies with Sinden included You Know What Sailors Are (1954), Mad About Men (1954), The Beachcomber (1954) with Robert Newton, To Paris with Love (1955) with Guinness, All for Mary (1955), Value for Money (1955) with Gregson and Diana Dors, Simon and Laura (1955) with Peter Finch and Kendall, An Alligator Named Daisy (1955) with Donald Sinden and Dors, Jumping for Joy (1956) with Frankie Howerd.

St John put writer Norman Hudis under long term contract early in that writers career.

According to a 1954 profile:
His highly-paid job gives him power to say what films will be made, how they will be made and who will make them. He works with 12 producer - director teams, 21 contract artists, a varying number of guest artists, a story department consisting of an editor, two assistants and three readers, and three contract scriptwriters. Pinewood Studios' quota of 15 films a year, for which St. John is responsible and which average £150,000 each, is the largest in Britain today. In his films, St. John has fostered such stars as Petula Clark, Kay Kendall, Anthony Steel, Terence Morgan, Dirk Bogarde and John Gregson and he has helped to promote Jack Hawkins, Glynis Johns and Norman Wisdom. In the past four years he has supervised the making of more than 50 films... St. John has earned a reputation for being a driving showman with a gift for succinct expression.
"He is like a ringmaster who is happy as long as his charges are performing correctly," said producer Peter Rogers. "His approach is: do what you want, but you know what I want," said director Robert Hamer.

International films
Rank had ambitions to make films that appeared in America. St. John used Gregory Peck in The Million Pound Note (1954) and The Purple Plain (1954).

In the late 1950s St. John financed a series of adventure films shot on location overseas in colour based on some best-selling novel. These included Campbell's Kingdom (1957), set in Canada, with Bogarde; Dangerous Exile (1957), a French Revolution tale with Louis Jourdan; Windom's Way (1957), set in Malaya, with Peter Finch; Robbery Under Arms (1957), set in Australia, with Finch; Sea Fury (1958), made in Spain with Victor McLaglen; The Wind Cannot Read (1958), set in India, with Bogarde; A Tale of Two Cities (1958), set in France, with Bogarde; The Gypsy and the Gentleman (1958) with Melinda Mercouri; A Night to Remember (1958) with Kenneth More; Nor the Moon by Night (1959), set in South Africa with Michael Craig; The 39 Steps (1959) and North West Frontier (1959) with More; and Ferry to Hong Kong (1960), made in Hong Kong with Orson Welles.

Rank continued to make comedies such as The Captain's Table (1959) with Gregson and Sinden and Too Many Crooks (1959).

Producer Betty Box called St. John "a wonderful old drunk. He got locked into some cellars over one weekend. He was quite happy. It was a whole weekend. And he was a boy from Alabama. He was a real deep south American. He was huge. He was six foot six. And heavy and hand- some. He was a wonderful man. But he didn’t quite fit into the British filmmaking tradition." Anthony Havelock-Allan said "he did what [Rank chairman John] Davis told him to... nice man but not creative at all, not imaginative. He just did what he was told."

Sir John Davis later said St. John "was jolly good. As executive producer his function was to produce films - to get together the units to make them. He was both a creative influence and a facilitator, with a grasp of the technical side of making films, and he understood the creative atmosphere."

Michael Powell called him "John Davis' yes-men at Pinewood" adding:
Everybody in show business knew Earl St. John, but nobody but John Davis would have thought of putting him in charge of production at Britain's premiere studio... He made many friends in show business, and few enemies. One doesn't kick a dog, and Earl was like a great St. Bernard dog in his desire to please, in his size and shape, in his great, lined face, and in his anxiety to agree with the last speaker. He puzzled artists with whom he had to work. Nobody disliked him, but nobody trusted him either. To put such a man — or such a dog — in charge of creative artists was a joke, or a crime, or both. To call such a man a has-been was a mistake. He had never been; he had just been around.
Contemporary historical consensus is that St. John's influence was limited, and he mainly did what Davis told him to do.

Roy Ward Baker later said "Earl was not [Daryl F. Zanuck. He was not a positive leader and ruthless driver if need be like Zanuck at Fox. He had no organisation to support him to speak of. He had a story department, dreamy, quite charming but dreamy... He found himself in charge of the studio and did his best to be in charge of the studio, he liked being in charge of the studio but he wasn't really a super positive contributor like Zanuck was."

However, when Bryan Forbes ran EMI Films he said he was influenced by Earl St. John and would find "myself thinking, 'How would Earl have handled this situation?'". He called him:
That enigmatic quasi-Englishman who convinced most strangers that he was a distinguished member of the aristocracy, whereas his apparent title sprang from the same line as Duke Ellington and King Vidor. Earl was a survivor. Frequently out of favour with the higher echelons, he stepped into the wings on several occasions to allow more flashy luminaries to occupy the stage. And when they departed to scant applause, as depart they inevitably did, there was Earl, unruffled and word perfect, to resume a familiar role. I certainly owe him more than one debt of gratitude, for in later years he gave me my first chance at direction. And when eventually I occupied a similar position at EMI, I often found myself thinking, how would Earl have handled this situation? He loved films, even bad films, and now when the industry is mostly in the control of men who treat films as just another commodity... one realizes what a giant Earl was."
Earl St. John had an at times difficult relationship with Dirk Bogarde but he cast Bogarde in Doctor in the House, which made him a big star, and suggested him for the lead in Victim.

Later years
St. John's slate of films became less successful in the 1960s. The British film industry turned to riskier subject matter. For instance St. John bought the film rights to the novel Saturday Night and Sunday Morning but the Rank board refused to let him make the film, which became a big success. He also refused to make a film of Look Back in Anger.

St. John retired in 1964, after The High Bright Sun (1964), the last collaboration between Ralph Thomas, Betty Box and Dirk Bogarde.

He died while on vacation in Spain, survived by his wife whom he married in 1946.

Select filmography
Tottie True (1948)
The Rocking Horse Winner (1949)
The Woman in Question (1950)
Highly Dangerous (1950)
The Reluctant Widow (1950)
Prelude to Fame (1950)
They Were Not Divided (1950)
The Browning Version (1951)
Encore (1951)
Made in Heaven (1952)
The Planter's Wife (1952) (a.k.a. Outpost in Malaya)
The Venetian Bird (1952) (a.k.a. The Assassin)
It Started in Paradise (1952)
The Importance of Being Earnest (1952)
The Card (1952) (a.k.a. The Promoter)
Hunted (1952)
Penny Princess (1952)
The Long Memory (1953)
Trouble in Store (1953)
Personal Affair (1953)
The Net (1953) (a.k.a. Project M7)
The Final Test (1953)
The Malta Story (1953)
Always a Bride (1953)
Desperate Moment (1953)
A Day to Remember (1953)
Genevieve (1953)
You Know What Sailors Are! (1953)
Turn the Key Softly (1953)
The Kidnappers (1953) (a.k.a. The Little Kidnappers)
The Million Pound Note (1954) (a.k.a. Man with a Million)
Mad About Men (1954)
Romeo and Juliet (1954)
The Beachcomber (1954)
The Seekers (1954) (a.k.a. Land of Fury)
Forbidden Cargo (1954)
Man with a Million (1954)
The Purple Plain (1954)
To Paris with Love (1954)
Doctor in the House (1954)
The Young Lovers (1954)
As Long As They're Happy (1955)
Man of the Moment (1955)
Above Us the Waves (1955)
The Woman for Joe (1955)
All for Mary (1955)
Value for Money (1955)
Simba (1955)
Passage Home (1955)
One Good Turn (1955)
Simon and Laura (1955)
Doctor at Sea (1955)
An Alligator Named Daisy (1955)
Tears for Simon (1956) (a.k.a. Lost)
House of Secrets (1956)
Jumping for Joy (1956)
The Black Tent (1956)
Jacqueline (1956)
Eyewitness (1956)
The Secret Place (1956)
A Town Like Alice (1956)
Checkpoint (1956)
The Spanish Gardener (1956)
Up in the World (1956)
The Battle of the River Plate (1956)
The One That Got Away (1957)
Ill Met by Moonlight (1957)
Miracle in Soho (1957)
Hell Drivers (1957)
High Tide at Noon (1957)
True as a Turtle (1957)
Doctor at Large (1957)
Campbell's Kingdom (1957)
Seven Thunders (1957)
Windom's Way (1957)
Just My Luck (1957)
Robbery Under Arms (1957)
Dangerous Exile (1957)
Rockets Galore (1957)
Across the Bridge (1957)
The Square Peg (1958)
The Captain's Table (1958)
Innocent Sinners (1958)
Sea Fury (1958)
The Violent Playground (1958)
A Tale of Two Cities (1958)
The Gypsy and the Gentleman (1958)
A Night to Remember (1958)
Carve Her Name with Pride (1958)
Nor the Moon by Night (1958) (a.k.a. Elephant Gun)
Floods of Fear (1958)
Storm Over Jamaica (1958) (a.k.a. Passionate Summer)
The Wind Cannot Read (1958)
The 39 Steps (1958)
Northwest Frontier (1959)
Operation Amsterdam (1959)
Too Many Crooks (1959)
The Heart of a Man (1959)
Ferry to Hong Kong (1959)
Sapphire (1959)
Upstairs and Downstairs (1959)
Interpol Calling (1959) (TV series)
Follow a Star (1959)
Make Mine Mink (1960)
Doctor in Love (1960)
Conspiracy of Hearts (1960)
The Bulldog Breed (1960)
No Love for Johnnie (1960)
No, My Darling Daughter (1961)
The Singer Not the Song (1961)
Flame in the Streets (1961)
In the Doghouse (1962)
On the Beat (1962)
Tiara Tahiti (1962)
The Wild and the Willing (1962)
A Pair of Briefs (1962)
A Stitch in Time (1963)
80,000 Suspects (1963)
The Informers (1963)
Doctor in Distress (1963)
Hot Enough for June (1964)
The Beauty Jungle (1964) (a.k.a. Contest Girl)
The High Bright Sun (1965)

References

External links

Earl St. John at BFI

1892 births
1968 deaths
People from Baton Rouge, Louisiana
Film producers from Louisiana